Carol: Original Motion Picture Soundtrack is the soundtrack to the 2015 film of the same name. The soundtrack compact disc includes the original score, composed, produced, orchestrated and conducted by Carter Burwell, and additional music performed by The Clovers, Billie Holiday, Georgia Gibbs, Les Paul and Mary Ford, and Jo Stafford. It was released in both digital download and compact disc formats by Varèse Sarabande on November 20, 2015. A double album vinyl of the soundtrack was released on June 24, 2016.

Development
Burwell had received the script of Carol before the film began principal photography. Director Todd Haynes sent him six CDs of songs from the 1950s that he and music supervisor Randy Poster had compiled. However, Burwell didn't begin composing the music until Haynes shot and assembled the film. Initially, Burwell considered using two solo instruments, as there were only two main characters and everyone else just passes through. Burwell began recording the track titled "Opening". He stated that composing such a piece first was an odd choice because none of the main characters appear in the opening scene. However, he felt it was important that what he composed induced the mood of the film and the unseen characters. Burwell also wrote several different ideas for this and sent them to Haynes.

Burwell wrote the score with a small ensemble consisting of eight to 17 musicians. The smallest arrangement consisted of string quartets with bass, harp, piano and clarinet. Apart from orchestration and conducting the score, the music was performed by the Seattle Symphony. The whole process, writing, recording and mixing, took about eight weeks for 38 minutes of music. Burwell described the character of Carol (played by Cate Blanchett) as "a cypher" and "a cool, aloof mystery". The instruments he used for her were piano, clarinet and vibe.

According to Burwell, there are three main themes in the score that communicate visual language. The music heard in the opening city scene depicts the "active engagement and passion" of Carol and Therese (played by Rooney Mara), conveying something about the characters before they are seen. This music becomes their love theme. For the theme expressing Therese's fascination with Carol, Burwell introduced a cloud of piano notes. The piano texture "required a little studio magic" with notes played differently by right and left hand; where the notes played by the left hand disappear into a cloud and those played by the right remain distinct enough to carry the melody. This was realized in the scene where Carol drives Therese to her house for the first time. The music appears like a public courtship moving somewhere private and thus the solo notes heard were the delay effects of notes that pile up into a cloud. The third theme is about absence and loss. The theme was expressed in the voice-over scene where Therese reads the letter from Carol explaining herself and the need to hasten back to New York. Burwell wrote open intervals such as the fourth, fifth and ninth, to hide the sentiment. Both women are brokenhearted and the music reflects the emptiness they feel.

Critical response 
Nev Pierce of Empire called Burwell's score "sumptuous". Stefan Ellison wrote in The Scene Magazine: "Carter Burwell's score is a beautiful piece, representing Carol and Therese's romance so well and never becoming overbearing, but rather a natural part of the environment." Michael Joyce of Ham&High stated: "The discrete way he underscores emotions is ideal for a tale of a love that dare not speak its name, set in a time when a lid was kept on that kind of thing." In his review for San Francisco Chronicle, Mick LaSalle wrote: "while underscoring [interior] scenes comes the sound of piped-in organ music ... that is just a little bit weird." On Combustible Celluloid, Jeffery M. Anderson commented that the score was "perfect" for the film.

In his review for The Arts Desk, Demetrios Matheou felt that Burwell's score, "reminiscent of Philip Glass's spare but highly emotive piano pieces", sets the mood. Ryan Gilbey of New Statesman magazine noted: "The score by Carter Burwell, laced with a snake charmer's seductiveness, swells and swoops." Andrew O'Hehir at Salon commented: "Carter Burwell's haunting score sets the mood by bridging the seemingly unbridgeable gap between Schubert, Duke Ellington and Philip Glass." In her review for Little White Lies, Sophie Kaufman called the score by Burwell as "yearning". Lewis Bazley of Sky Movies stated: "Carter Burwell's score soothes and soars."

In a series of articles regarding the best of the 2010s in film, IndieWire selected Carter Burwell's score as the second best of the decade.

Accolades 

The score for Carol received nominations from the Academy Awards, Golden Globe Awards, Critics' Choice Movie Awards, and London Film Critics' Circle It won Best Music from the Los Angeles Film Critics Association, the Satellite Award for Best Original Score and Best Score by the International Cinephile Society. In 2016 it won the Public Choice Award for the Best Score of the Year by the World Soundtrack Awards; in addition, Carter Burwell also received the Film Composer of the Year award.

Track listing

Songs and music not featured on soundtrack CD
Not featured on the soundtrack but included in the film:

 "Farmers Market" performed by Annie Ross
 "A Garden in the Rain" performed by Al Alberts,  The Four Aces
 "Perdido" performed by Woody Herman
 "Something from a Fool" performed by Jimmy Scott
 "Silver Bells" performed by Perry Como
 "That's the Chance You Take" performed by Eddie Fisher
 "Deeply" performed by Buddy Stewart
 "Slow Poke" performed by Pee Wee King and His Golden Cowboys
 "Mullenium" performed by Gerry Mulligan
 "Why Don't You Believe Me" performed by Patti Page
 "Extrovert" performed by Al Lerner

Performed by Vince Giordano & The Nighthawks:

 "Willow Weep for Me" 
 "These Foolish Things"
 "Look for the Silver Lining"
 "Don't Blame Me"
 "Auld Lang Syne"
 "Peg o' My Heart"

Rooney Mara performed "Easy Living" on the piano.

Vinyl soundtrack 
The vinyl version of the soundtrack is divided into two, double-sided, 10-inch discs: "Album One − The Score" and "Album Two − The Songs", and features three additional song tracks not released on the compact disc:

 "A Garden in the Rain" performed by The Four Aces featuring Al Alberts
 "Slow Poke" performed by Pee Wee King and His Golden West Cowboys
 "Why Don't You Believe Me" performed by Patti Page

Personnel
Score composed, produced, orchestrated and conducted by Carter Burwell.

Technical
Executive producer – Robert Townson
Music scoring mixer – Michael Farrow
Contractor – David Sabee
Copyist – Robert Puff
Music editor – Todd Kasow
Composer's assistant – Dean Parker
Executive music producer – Mark Lo
Music supervisor – Randall Poster
Music business and legal executive – Nora Mullally
Music consultant and clearance executive – Matt Biffa
Music services – Cutting Edge
Mastering – Patricia Sullivan

Musicians

String quintet
Violins – Simon James and Gennady Filimonov
Viola – Mara Gearman
Cello – Wendy Sutter
Bass – Jonathan Burnstein

Additional instruments
Violin – Brittany Boulding and Misha Shmidt
Viola – Joseph Gottesman
Cello – Eric Han
Piano – Cristina Valdes
Harp – John Carrington
Processed piano – Carter Burwell
Flute – Erin James
Clarinets – Frank Kowalsky, Jennifer Nelson and Sean Osborn
Oboe – Chengwen Winnie Lai
Bassoon – Evan Kuhlmann
Horn – Mark Robbins

Charts

See also 
 List of accolades received by Carol (film)

Notes

References

Further reading 

 Evangelista, Chris (October 27, 2015).  Carter Burwell's ‘Carol’ Soundtrack Is a Must Buy. CutPrintFilm
 Goble, Blake (January 10, 2016).  Various Artists – Carol OST. Consequence of Sound
 McCue, Michelle (October 27, 2015).  Composer Carter Burwell's CAROL Soundtrack Available November 20. We Are Movie Geeks
 PBS NewsHour (February 17, 2016).  How composer Carter Burwell helped craft the love story of ‘Carol’. PBS
 Pond, Steve (December 31, 2015).  How 'Carol' Score Turned Cate Blanchett and Rooney Mara’s Flirtation Into Sex (Exclusive Video). TheWrap
 Rosenbloom, Etan (November 19, 2015).   Film Music Friday: Carter Burwell on Carol. ASCAP
 Simons, Pete (November 7, 2015).  Carol (Carter Burwell). Synchrotones 
 Southall, James (December 15, 2015).  Carol. Movie Wave
 Thilman, James (November 6, 2015).  Lifted By The Music, ‘Carol’ Soars. The Huffington Post

External links
  Official website (Number 9 Films) (Archive)
  (The Weinstein Company) (Archive)
  Official website (StudioCanal) (Archive) 
  Carol at TWC Guilds (Weinstein Company, Films For Consideration) (Archive)
  Carol - Original Motion Picture Soundtrack website (Archive)
  Carol at Varèse Sarabande
  Carol - A Visual Soundtrack - Carter Burwell  by Varèse Sarabande Records  on YouTube
  CAROL - Carter Burwell Featurette  by The Weinstein Company on YouTube
  Carol (CD Booklet) at i-classical.com
  Carol  at Soundtrack.Net
 
 

2015 soundtrack albums
Carter Burwell albums
Varèse Sarabande soundtracks
Romance film soundtracks
Drama film soundtracks